Filipa Martins may refer to:

 Ana Filipa Martins (born 1996), Portuguese artistic gymnast
 Filipa Martins (athlete) (born 1992), Portuguese sprinter